The House of Auersperg ( or Turjaški) is an Austrian princely family, which held estates in Austria and Tengen (in Baden-Württemberg, Germany). The princely family of Auersperg was a junior branch of the house of Counts of Auersperg from Carniola, one of the hereditary Habsburg duchies in what is now Slovenia. It rose to princely status in 1653 and after acquiring Tengen, they became immediate Princes of the Holy Roman Empire. The princes of Auersperg also held at various times the duchies of Münsterberg and Gottschee. Their territories were mediatised by Austria and Baden in 1806. The family is counted as high nobility.

History

Origins to early modern period

The former edelfrei family was first mentioned as Ursperch in an 1162 deed issued by Duke Herman II of Carinthia at his residence St. Veit. Their ancestral seat was Turjak Castle (later Burg Auersperg) in the March of Carniola, according to an engraving on site built in 1067 by one Conrad of Auersperg. Above the engraving stands the original Auersperg coat of arms, displaying an aurochs (German: Auerochs(e) or Ur, Slovene: Tur). The family name may derive from Ursberg in Swabia, their ancestors probably settled in Lower Carniola after the victory of King Otto I of Germany over the Hungarian forces at the 955 Battle of Lechfeld.  They held large estates from Grosuplje in the north down to Velike Lašče and Ribnica, rivalling with the Meinhardiner counts of Görz, the Carinthian Ortenburg dynasty and the Patriarchs of Aquileia.

In the 13th century, the high noble line became extinct and was succeeded by a dynasty of ministeriales. In the mid 15th century, this line split into two eponymous branches with the brothers Pankraz II (1441–1496) and Volkhard VIII (1442–1508). The Auerspergs inherited the estate of Žužemberk and Šumberk in the Windic March, which passed on to a cadet branch. Pankraz II of Auersperg held Turjak Castle in the Duchy of Carniola, married with Anne of Frankopan. His son Trojan (1495–1541) served at the Habsburg courts in Ljubljana and the Austrian capital Vienna as a Carniolan chamberlain and regent, Imperial Hofrat and commander during the Ottoman Siege of Vienna in 1529. Trojan's son Herbard VIII von Auersperg (1528–1575), called Hervard Turjaški in Slovene, was Carniolan Landeshauptmann and commander of the Croatian and Slavonian Military Frontier, he played a vital role as a patron of Primož Trubar, Jurij Dalmatin and the Protestant Reformation in the Slovene Lands. He received the noble rank of an Imperial Baron (Reichsfreiherr) in 1550, his descendants were elevated to Imperial Counts (Reichsgrafen) in 1630.

The Auersperg cadet branch, named after the castle of Šumberk in Lower Carniola, was influential throughout the 16th century. Wilhelm Auersperg (called "the Rich", cca. 1462–1507) and his nephew Hans (1480–1529) were regents (Landeshauptmann) of Carniola. Hans's son Wolfgang-Engelbert was considered one of the most educated noblemen in Carniola, and a strong supporter of Lutheranism. His son Andreas von Auersperg was one of the military commanders during the decisive Battle of Sisak against the Ottomans, gaining the nickname "Carniolan Achilles". In the early 17th century, the Šumberk cadet line, which was considered wealthier and more influential than the main one, died out; its estates were transferred back to the main line, and were later mostly inherited by the so-called "princely branch" of the family.

17th to 19th centuries

Count Johann Weikhard of Auersperg (1615–1677) served as head of the Aulic Council (Reichshofrat), as envoy of Emperor Ferdinand III in the negotiations preparing the 1648 Peace of Westphalia, and as a tutor to young King Ferdinand IV. Emperor Ferdinand III elevated him to a hereditary Prince of the Holy Roman Empire in 1653 and enfeoffed him with the Silesian Duchy of Münsterberg in the Lands of the Bohemian Crown the next year. In 1663 Johann Weikhard received in pawn the lands of the extinct Counts of Tengen (Thengen), a Habsburg possession in Further Austria since 1522, and reached Imperial immediacy as Gefürsteter Graf with a seat in the Imperial Diet the next year.

The Duchy of Münsterberg was conquered by Prussia in the course of the First Silesian War with Austria in 1742, nevertheless the Auerspergs at first could retain their possessions as a Silesian state country. In 1791 Karl Joseph of Auersperg finally sold Münsterberg to King Frederick William II of Prussia. In the same year, Emperor Leopold II elevated him to the Duke of Gottschee and the Auersperg owned County of Gottschee to the Duchy of Gottschee (German: Herzogtum Gottschee, Slovene: Kočevska Vojvodina). Upon the dissolution of the Holy Roman Empire in 1806, the Auersperg territory at Tengen was mediatised to the Grand Duchy of Baden.

Princes of Auersperg (1653–present) 

 Johann Weikhard, 1st Prince 1653–1677, Count of Auersperg, Duke of Silesia-Münsterberg (1615–1677)
 Johann Ferdinand, 2nd Prince 1677–1705, Duke of Silesia-Munsterberg (1655–1705)
  Franz Karl, 3rd Prince 1705–1713, Duke of Silesia-Munsterberg (1660–1713)
  Heinrich Joseph Johann, 4th Prince 1713–1783, Duke of Silesia-Munsterberg (1697–1783)
  Karl Josef, 5th Prince 1783–1800, Duke of Silesia-Munsterberg then Duke of Gottschee (1720–1800)
  Wilhelm I, 6th Prince 1800–1822, Duke of Gottschee (1749–1822)
  Wilhelm II, 7th Prince 1822–1827, Duke of Gottschee (1782–1827)
 Karl Wilhelm Philipp, 8th Prince 1827–1890, Duke of Gottschee, Minister-President of Cisleithania 1867–1868 (1814–1890)
  Prince Adolf of Auersperg, Minister-President of Cisleithania 1871–1879 (1821–1885)
  Karl, 9th Prince 1890–1927, Duke of Gottschee (1859–1927)
 Adolf, Hereditary Prince of Auersperg (1886–1923)
 Karl Adolf, 10th Prince 1927–2006, Duke of Gottschee, Princely Count of Wels (1915–2006) 
 Adolf, 11th Prince 2006–present, Duke of Gottschee, Princely Count of Wels (born 1937)
 Prince Carl Adolf (born 1962)
 Prince Alexander (born 1963)
  Prince Alejandro (born 1993)
  Prince Andreas (born 1980)
  Prince Ferdinand (born 1939)
  Prince Ferdinand (born 1976)
 Prince Juan Sebastián (born 2010)
 Prince Matías (born 2012)
 Prince Guillermo (born 2015)
  Prince Franz Weikhard of Auersperg (1923–2004), 3 sons, each with son(s)
  Karl Alain, 1st Prince of Auersperg-Breunner 1929–1980 (1895–1980)
 Karl, 2nd Prince of Auersperg-Breunner 1980–present (b. 1930), 3 sons, each with sons
  Prince Heinrich (b.1931)
  Prince Johann (b. 1961)

Sources: 

 Other family members 
 Herbard VIII von Auersperg (1528–1575), Habsburg general in the wars against the Ottoman Empire
 Andreas von Auersperg (1556–1593), the "Carniolan Achilles", a  leader  in the Battle of Sisak in 1593
 Joseph Franz Auersperg (1734–1795), Austrian count, prince bishop of Passau, cardinal
 Count Anton Alexander von Auersperg (1806–1876), Austrian poet ("Anastasius Grün") and liberal politician from Carniola

Properties
The Auerspergs were among the largest landowners in Carniola. In addition to Turjak Castle, which was their central possession, for centuries they were the owners of many other properties, both within and outside their territories. Among these were two Baroque palaces in the center of Ljubljana, Turjaška palača (Auersperg Palace) and Knežji dvorec, which means Princely Palace''. They were both damaged in the 1895 Easter earthquake and the land was sold to the municipality. The Slovene National and University Library was built on the site of the Princely Palace in the 1930s, modelled on the latter's size and form. The City Museum of Ljubljana was opened at the Auersperg Palace in 1937.

Palais Auersperg is a Baroque palace at Auerspergstrasse 1 in the Josefstadt or eighth district of Vienna. The palace was owned by the family from 1777 to 1953.

Turjak Castle and all the other Slovenian property was seized by the government of Yugoslavia in 1946. It has never been returned to the head of the family. Other branches however still own property in Austria and Southern Tyrol (Italy):

See also
 Austrian nobility
 Mediatized Houses
 List of princes of Austria-Hungary
 List of titled noble families in the Kingdom of Hungary

References

External links

 Website of Ernegg Castle, Lower Austria
 European Heraldry page

 
1663 establishments in the Holy Roman Empire
1806 disestablishments in the Holy Roman Empire
States and territories established in 1550
Lists of princes
Principalities of the Holy Roman Empire
Habsburg monarchy

cs:Auerspergové
de:Auersperg
nl:Auersperg
pl:Auersperg
ru:Ауэршперги
sl:Auerspergi
zh:奥埃尔斯佩格亲王